Acrolophus filicornis is a moth of the family Acrolophidae. It was described by Walsingham in 1887. It is found in North America, including Arizona.

References

Moths described in 1887
filicornis